Lakis Fylaktou (born 28 January 1964) is a Cypriot swimmer. He competed in two events at the 1980 Summer Olympics at the age of 16. At the 1980 Summer Olympics, Fylaktou competed in the Men's 100 m freestyle and the Men's 100 m backstroke events. In the Men's 100 m freestyle event, Fylaktou was entered into heat two. He finished 7th of 8 swimmers beating only Angola's Jorge Lima with a time of 57.41 seconds. In the Men's 100 m backstroke, Fylaktou finished 7th out of 7 swimmers with a time of 1:08.92 seconds. Fylaktou didn't advance too the later stages of each of his events.

References

External links
 

1964 births
Living people
Cypriot male swimmers
Olympic swimmers of Cyprus
Swimmers at the 1980 Summer Olympics
Place of birth missing (living people)